Monopoli is a railway station in the Italian town of Monopoli, in the Province of Bari, Apulia. The station lies on the Adriatic Railway (Ancona–Lecce). The train services are operated by Trenitalia.

Train services
The station is served by the following service(s):

Intercity services Bologna - Rimini - Ancona - Pescara - Foggia - Bari - Brindisi - Lecce
Night train (Intercity Night) Rome - Foggia - Bari - Brindisi - Lecce
Night train (Intercity Night) Milan - Parma - Bologna - Ancona - Pescara - Foggia - Bari - Brindisi - Lecce
Night train (Intercity Night) Turin - Alessandria - Bologna - Ancona - Pescara - Foggia - Bari - Brindisi - Lecce
Regional services (Treno regionale) Bari - Monopoli - Brindisi - Lecce

External links
  Rail Europe

See also
Railway stations in Italy
List of railway stations in Apulia
Rail transport in Italy
History of rail transport in Italy

External links

This article is based upon a translation of the Italian language version as at May 2014.

Railway stations in Apulia
Railway station
Railway stations opened in 1865
Buildings and structures in the Province of Bari